"I Got a Feeling" is a song recorded by American Motown vocal group Four Tops for their 1966 album, On Top. It was written by Holland–Dozier–Holland and produced by Brian Holland and Lamont Dozier. In 1967, "I Got a Feeling" was covered by Barbara Randolph. This version was produced by Hal Davis and released as a single in 1967.

Lisa Stansfield version

British singer Lisa Stansfield covered "I Got a Feeling" in 1983 and released it as a single in the United Kingdom. Her version was produced by David Pickerill. The single's B-side included "Red Lights," another song recorded by Stansfield. "I Got a Feeling" was never included on any of Stansfield's albums but "Red Lights" was featured on the In Session in 1996.

Track listings
UK 7" single
"I Got a Feeling"
"Red Lights"

References

1966 songs
Four Tops songs
1967 singles
Lisa Stansfield songs
1983 singles
Songs written by Holland–Dozier–Holland
Polydor Records singles